The Devonshire Park Theatre is a Victorian theatre located in the town of Eastbourne, in the coastal region of East Sussex. The theatre was designed by Henry Currey and was built in 1884. In 1903, it was further improved by the theatre architect Frank Matcham. The building was designated as a Grade II listed building on 3 July 1981. The theatre has a seating capacity of 936.

See also
Eastbourne Theatres

References

External links
 

Theatres in Eastbourne
1884 establishments in England